The Mohammedan Sporting Club, a football club of Kolkata, won the Durand Cup at the beginning of the 2013–14 season. They didn't do so well in the I-League, where they lost 6 of their first 13 matches and won 3. In mid-season Sanjoy Sen took over as coach.

Competitions

Durand Cup

Quarter-finals

Semi-finals

Final

I-League

Results by round

Matches
Mohammedan S.C. results of I-League matches as of 22 December 2013

Federation Cup

Group stage

Squad information

On 17 December 2013 Sanjoy Sen was officially announced as the new Coach of Mohammedan Sporting Club, replacing former coach Abdul Aziz Moshood.

References

Mohammedan SC (Kolkata) seasons
Mohammedan